Count Georg Magnus Sprengtporten (16 December 1740 – 13 October 1819), was a Finland-Swedish politician, younger brother of Jacob Magnus Sprengtporten. Since he defected to Russia, he went down in Swedish history as a traitor.

Early life
Sprengtporten was born in Porvoo, Uusimaa, Kingdom of Sweden (now Finland). He entered the army and rose to the rank of captain during the Seven Years' War. He assisted his brother in the revolution of 1772, and in 1775 was made a colonel and brigadier of the Savolax brigade in east Finland. Here he distinguished himself greatly as an organizer and administrator. The military school which he founded at Haapaniemi (then Tuhkaniemi), Kuopio (1 August 1780 until 1 May 1781 when it was moved to Haapaniemi estate in Rantasalmi, where it operated until a transfer to Hamina in 1819) subsequently became a state institution (Hamina Cadet School).

1779–81
Like his brother he also came to the conclusion that his services had not been adequately appreciated, and the flattering way in which he was welcomed by the Russian court during a visit to Saint Petersburg in 1779 still further incensed him against the perceived ingratitude of his own sovereign. For the next two years he was in the French service, returning to Finland in 1781. Due in part to contacts with Benjamin Franklin who was there contemporaneously he conceived of the idea of separating the grand duchy from Sweden. This aim was first approached through the Walhalla-orden subversive secret society and scheming with the king's brother, Charles XIII of Sweden. This scheming was apparently stillborn, as Charles informed his brother of the schemers' approaches.

1786
The chosen Plan B was to establish an independent state under the protection of Russia. During the Riksdag of 1786 he openly opposed Gustav III of Sweden, at the same time engaging in a secret and treasonable correspondence with the Russian ministers with the view of inducing them to assist his plans for an independent Finland by force of arms.

1788–1808
In the following year, at the invitation of Catherine II of Russia, he formally entered the Russian service. When the Russo-Swedish War of 1788–1790 began, Sprengtporten received the command of a Russian army corps directed against Finland. He took no direct part in the Anjala conspiracy but urged Catherine to support it more energetically. His own negotiations with his fellow countrymen, especially after Gustav III of Sweden had brought the treacherous army officers of the Anjala conspiracy back to their allegiance, failed utterly. Nor was he able to serve Russia very effectively in the field for he was seriously wounded at the battle of Porrassalmi 1789. At the end of the war, indeed, his position was somewhat precarious, as the High Court of Turku condemned him as a traitor, while Catherine regarded him as an incompetent impostor who could not perform his promises. For the next five years, therefore 1793–1798, he thought it expedient to quit Russia and live at Teplice in Bohemia. He was re-employed by the emperor Paul of Russia who, in 1800, sent him to negotiate with Napoleon concerning the Maltese Order and the interchange of prisoners. After Paul's death Sprengtporten was again in disgrace for seven years, but was consulted in 1808 on the eve of the outbreak of hostilities with France. On 1 December 1808 he was appointed the first Russian Governor-General of Finland with the title of count, but was so unpopular that he had to resign his post the following year.

Retirement
The last ten years of his life were lived in retirement. Sprengtporten died in Saint Petersburg in 1819.

Memorial stones
Georg Magnus Sprengtporten's Memorial stones are located in Harbour park (Satamapuisto) of Kuopio, near the port of Kuopio and near the place where his military school was originally located. While staying in Teplice, Sprengtporten was in regular contact with the Count Waldstein's librarian, Giacomo Casanova. Their correspondence has been saved and is well known to scholars.

References

External links
Sprengtporten, Georg Magnus. The National Biography of Finland. 

|-

1740 births
1819 deaths
People from Porvoo
Swedish-speaking Finns
Swedish generals
Finnish politicians
Swedish military personnel of the Finnish War
18th-century Finnish military personnel
19th-century Finnish people
Gustavian era people
Governors of the Grand Duchy of Finland
Finnish people from the Russian Empire
Barons of the Russian Empire
Counts of the Russian Empire
Georg Magnus